Ajax is an unincorporated community in Pennington County, in the U.S. state of South Dakota.

The community was named for Ajax, a hero in Greek mythology.

References

Unincorporated communities in Pennington County, South Dakota
Unincorporated communities in South Dakota